The 2017 LFL US season is the eighth season of the Legends Football League (LFL) in the United States. It began 14 April 2017, and concluded 5 August 2017.

Developments 
In January 2017 the LFL announced that it had signed a multi-year contract with Candle and Caleb to provide new uniforms for the league, including alternative uniforms with pants.

In February Super Channel announced that it had signed a three-year deal to broadcast the LFL in Canada.

Standings 
No ties occurred this season.

Eastern Conference

Western Conference 

x - clinched conference titley - clinched playoff berth

Season schedule

Playoffs 

Conference Championships were played on 20 August 2017 at Sears Centre Arena in Hoffman Estates, Illinois. The Seattle Mist defeated the Los Angeles Temptation 28–13 to win the Western Conference title and advance to their third straight Legends Cup appearance.  In the Eastern Conference, the Atlanta Steam got their first victory over the defending champion Chicago Bliss in a 14–6 upset to win the title and make their second appearance in the championship game.

The 2017 Legends Cup was held on 3 September 2017 at Citizens Business Bank Arena in Ontario, California.  The lead swung back and forth throughout the game with Seattle scoring early, Atlanta taking the lead, and Seattle retaking it 18-14 again before the half.  The score see-sawed in the second half as well before Seattle pulled away in the fourth quarter to win their second Legends Cup title in three years with a 38–28 victory.  Seattle running back Stevi Schnoor was named MVP of the game.

References

2017 in American football
Legends Football League